The Catalogus Professorum Rostochiensium (CPR) is a freely accessible online catalogue of all professors at the University of Rostock from 1419 to the present. Each entry documents a professor's biographical data and scientific achievements and is linked with further digitized resources such as photographs or handwritten documents. The project has not yet been finished.
The CPR currently provides more than 2,200 individual-level records that can be fully researched. The application of Integrated Authority Files (GNDs) automatically interlinks the Catalogus with further external web resources (e.g. the Rostock Matrikelportal) and vice versa.

References

External links 
 
 Main page of the Catalogus Professorum Rostochiensium (CPR)

University of Rostock